Rekha Punekar is a former Test and One Day International cricketer who represented India. She is a right-hand batsman and has played two Tests and one ODIs.

References

Living people
People from Maharashtra
Indian women cricketers
India women One Day International cricketers
India women Test cricketers
Marathi people
Railways women cricketers
Year of birth missing (living people)